= The Internet Philosophy Ontology Project =

Classification model for philosophical knowledge

Logo

The Internet Philosophy Ontology Project (InPhO /ˈɪnfoʊ/) is a project of Indiana University's Cognitive Science Program funded by a grant from the National Endowment for the Humanities. It is an attempt to create a model of the discipline of philosophy as an online resource. The website makes it possible to search and navigate via relations among philosophical ideas, scholars and works.
